John Coke (1563–1644) was an English politician, Lord Privy Seal.

John Coke may also refer to:
John Coke (fl. 1390), MP for Truro (UK Parliament constituency) in 1390
John Coke (died 1650) (1607–1650), MP for Derbyshire 1640–1650
John Coke (died 1692) (1653–1692), MP for Derby 1685–1690
John Coke (East India Company officer), founder of the 55th Coke's Rifles (Frontier Force)
John Talbot Coke (1841–1912), British Army officer

See also
John Cooke (disambiguation) (same pronunciation)
John Cook (disambiguation) (same pronunciation)